Sheldon Solomon is an American social psychologist at Skidmore College, Saratoga Springs, New York. He earned his B.A. from Franklin & Marshall College and his doctoral degree from the University of Kansas. He is best known for developing terror management theory, along with Jeff Greenberg and Tom Pyszczynski, which is concerned with how humans deal with their own sense of mortality.
The three co-authored the book The Worm at the Core: On the role of Death in Life in 2015.

Solomon is the Ross Professor for Interdisciplinary Studies at Skidmore. He is the author or co-author of over one hundred articles and several books, and he has been featured in several films, including Flight from Death and Planet of the Humans. In the latter, he links the pursuit of renewable energy sources, such as wind and solar, to the reluctance of humans to face their own mortality.

Solomon is also the co-founder of Esperanto, a restaurant in Saratoga Springs, and inventor of the "doughboy"—dough filled with cheese, chicken, and spices.

References

External links
 Sheldon Solomon at Department of Psychology, Skidmore College
 
 Sheldon Solomon: Death and Meaning | Lex Fridman Podcast #117

Year of birth missing (living people)
Living people
21st-century American psychologists
Franklin & Marshall College alumni
University of Kansas alumni
Social psychologists
Skidmore College faculty